Buffalo Gals Back to Skool is a CD by Malcolm McLaren that was released on September 25, 1998. It is based on McLaren's 1982 single "Buffalo Gals".

Track listing 
 "It Was A New York Phenomenon" (Malcolm McLaren) - 1:57
 "Class In Session" (Da Boogie Man) - 2:33
 "Buffalo Gals (Back To Skool)" (Remix) (Rakim) - 4:22
 "Bring It Back" (Remix) (Soulson) - 4:49
 "Zulu Nation Party" (Malcolm McLaren) - 2:43
 "Off The Top" (Live) (Hannibal Lechter) - 6:17
 "Bow Wow Wow Show (Live) (Malcolm McLaren) - 1:34
 "World Famous Supreme Team Show WHBI" (Link) (The World Famous Supreme Team Radio Show) - 0:36
 "Buffalo Gals" (Original Version; (DJ Cut; Special Stereo Mix) (Malcolm McLaren) - 3:46
 "Let It Flow (Do You Like Scratchin'?)" (KRS-One) - 3:57
 "Psalms" (T'Kalla) - 1:48
 "Hey DJ" (Original 12' Mix) (The World Famous Supreme Team) - 6:06
 "42nd Street" (Malcolm McLaren) - 2:06
 "World Famous Supreme Team Show WHBI" (Link) (The World Famous Supreme Team Radio Show) - 2:23
 "Do You Like Scratchin'?" (Original) (Malcolm McLaren & The World Famous Supreme Team) - 3:45
 "World Famous Supreme Team Show WHBI" (Link) (The World Famous Supreme Team Radio Show) - 0:24
 "Hey DJ" (De La Soul) - 4:29
 "She's Looking Like A Hobo" (Original Version) (Malcolm McLaren) - 3:15
 "World Famous Supreme Team Show WHBI" (Link) (The World Famous Supreme Team Radio Show) - 0:23
 "World Famous" (Original Version) (The World Famous Supreme Team) - 2:26
 "Shout Outs" (Forrest Getemgump and Burn One) - 1:36
 "Buffalo Gals (Back To Skool, Part 2)" (Soulson) - 3:54
 "Building / Adding On" (The World Famous Supreme Team) - 4:00

Personnel 

Musicians and performers
 Malcolm McLaren – lead vocals, horn
 World's Famous Supreme Team
 De La Soul
 Chris "Poppa Weely" Percival – lead vocals
 Soulson – lead vocals and backing vocals
 Stevie Blass – keyboards, backing vocals
 Shelly Jefferson – backing vocals
 Rakim – backing vocals
 Courtney Terry – backing vocals

Editing, mixing, and remixing
 Sean Coffey
 David Jude Jolicoeur
 Native Son
 Yianni Papadopoulos
 Scars

Engineering
 Sean Coffey
 Matt Hathaway
 Andy Katz
 Paul Oliviera
 Scars

Photography
 Bob Gruen
 Michael Halsband
 Bruce Stansbury

Producers
 Stephen Hague
 Trevor Horn
 KRS-One
 Malcolm McLaren
 Rakim
 Scars

Malcolm McLaren albums
Albums produced by Stephen Hague
Albums produced by Trevor Horn
1998 compilation albums
Hip hop albums by English artists